Facundo, el tigre de los llanos is a 1952 Argentine biopic film based on the life of La Rioja province's strongman Facundo Quiroga. The movie was directed by Miguel P. Tato and Carlos F. Borcosque.

Cast
Francisco Martínez Allende 		
Zoe Ducos 		
Félix Rivero 		
Miguel Bebán 		
Jorge Molina Salas 	
Pascual Nacarati 		
Mario Cozza 			
Hugo Mújica 		
Cirilo Etulain

References

External links
 

1952 films
1950s Spanish-language films
Argentine black-and-white films
Films directed by Carlos F. Borcosque
Argentine drama films
1952 drama films
1950s Argentine films